Alejandro Alfredo Delfino (born 18 September 1989) is an Argentine–born Chilean footballer. His current club is Primera B side Deportes Recoleta.

Honours

Player
Banfield
 Argentine Primera División (1): 2009 Apertura

References

1989 births
Living people
Sportspeople from Buenos Aires Province
Argentine footballers
Argentine expatriate footballers
Argentine emigrants to Chile
Naturalized citizens of Chile
Chilean footballers
Club Atlético Banfield footballers
C.D. Antofagasta footballers
Rangers de Talca footballers
Deportes Recoleta footballers
Argentine Primera División players
Primera Nacional players
Chilean Primera División players
Primera B de Chile players
Expatriate footballers in Chile
Argentine expatriate sportspeople in Chile
Association football defenders